Jane Yonge is a New Zealand theatre director of Fijian and Chinese descent.

Biography 
Yonge grew up in Auckland. Her father is Fijian and her mother was Chinese-Fijian. Yonge's mother died when she was 23 years old and Yonge travelled to China to explore her mother's culture.

Yonge graduated from the University of Auckland in 2011 with a bachelor's degree in drama. In 2013 she moved to Wellington and studied theatre at Victoria University of Wellington and Toi Whakaari: New Zealand Drama School, graduating in 2015 with a master's degree of theatre arts in directing. In 2019 she studied in New York under a Fulbright Program award, graduating with a master's degree in arts politics from New York University Tisch School of the Arts.

Career

References

New Zealand theatre directors
New Zealand people of Fijian descent
People from Auckland
Victoria University of Wellington alumni
University of Auckland alumni
Tisch School of the Arts alumni

Living people
Year of birth missing (living people)
Women theatre directors
New Zealand people of Chinese-Fijian descent